The Independent Republicans (RI) were a liberal-conservative political group in France founded in 1962, which became a political party in 1966 known as the National Federation of the Independent Republicans (Fédération nationale des républicains et indépendants, FNRI). Its leader was Valéry Giscard d'Estaing.

In 1977 it became the Republican Party which joined the Union for French Democracy (UDF) the following year.

History 
The Independent Republicans came from the liberal-conservative National Centre of Independents and Peasants (CNIP). In 1962, the CNIP chose to leave Charles de Gaulle's coalition due to his Euroscepticism and the presidentialisation of the regime. But, the CNIP ministers refused to leave the cabinet and the "presidential majority". Under the leadership of the Minister of Economy and Finances Valéry Giscard d'Estaing, they created the group of the Independent Republicans. It was the small partner of the Gaullists which tried to influence the executive's policy in favour of economic liberalism and European federalism.

The relation with the Gaullists tensed when Giscard was dismissed from the cabinet in 1966. The group became a political party, the National Federation of the Independent Republicans (FNRI), directed by the general secretary Michel Poniatowski. Giscard defined the Independent Republicans as "liberal, centrist and pro-European". It stood in the parliamentary majority, but chosen a critical attitude. Giscard summed up his opinion about the Gaullist policy by a "yes, but...".

In 1969, the party divided about the referendum of regionalisation and Senate's reform. Giscard called to vote "no". President de Gaulle resigned when the "no" won. The FNRI supported the winning candidacy of Georges Pompidou for the presidency and its leader re-integrated the cabinet as Economy Minister.
 
In 1974, after President Pompidou's death, Giscard announced his candidacy at the 1974 presidential election. It was supported by the FNRI, the Reform Movement and, covertly, by some Gaullists. He eliminated Gaullist Jacques Chaban-Delmas in the first round and then defeated Socialist François Mitterrand in the run-off.

Three years later, the FNRI was replaced by the Republican Party (PR) which became the liberal-conservative wing of the Union for French Democracy (UDF) created in 1978.

Election results

Presidential

National Assembly

References

1962 establishments in France
1977 disestablishments in France
Defunct political parties in France
Political parties of the French Fifth Republic
Defunct liberal political parties
Liberal conservative parties
Right-wing parties in France
Political parties established in 1966
Political parties disestablished in 1977
Valéry Giscard d'Estaing